When the Roses Bloom Again is the second album by Laura Cantrell, originally released in 2002.

Track listing
"Too Late for Tonight" (Cantrell, Francis MacDonald) – 2:30
"All the Same to You" (Joe Flood) – 3:06
"Early Years" (Cantrell) – 3:38
"Don't Break the Heart" (Amy Rigby) – 3:47
"Wait" (Jay Sherman-Godfrey) – 3:23
"Mountain Fern" (Cantrell) – 4:15
"Vaguest Idea" (Dan Prater) – 3:06
"Yonder Comes a Freight Train" (Ray Pennington) – 3:21
"Broken Again" (Cantrell) – 3:43
"When the Roses Bloom Again" (Cobb/Edwards, arranged by Wilco) – 4:05
"Conqueror's Song" (Dave Schramm) – 3:52
"Oh So Many Years" (Frankie Bailes) – 3:10

Personnel
Laura Cantrell - vocals
Jay Sherman-Godfrey - acoustic guitar, electric guitar, organ, piano, backing vocals
Jon Graboff - pedal steel guitar, mandolin, electric guitar, acoustic guitar, autoharp
Jeremy Chatzky - bass guitar
Doug Wygal - drums
Robin Goldwasser - backing vocals
Mary Lee Kortes - backing vocals
Dan Prater - backing vocals
Kenny Kosek - violin

References 

2002 albums
Laura Cantrell albums
Diesel Only Records albums